Vajdej is the Hungarian name for two villages in Romania:

 Vaidei village, Romos Commune, Hunedoara County
 Râu Mic village, Sălașu de Sus Commune, Hunedoara County